Sir Henry Pollard Willoughby, 3rd Baronet (17 November 1796 – 23 March 1865) was a British Conservative Member of Parliament. He represented the constituencies of Newcastle-under-Lyme (12 December 1832 – 5 January 1835), Yarmouth (Isle of Wight) (3 May 1831 – 1832) and Evesham (29 July 1847 – 7 July 1852).

References

External links 

1796 births
1865 deaths
Baronets in the Baronetage of Great Britain
Conservative Party (UK) MPs for English constituencies
UK MPs 1831–1832
UK MPs 1832–1835
UK MPs 1847–1852
UK MPs 1852–1857
UK MPs 1857–1859
UK MPs 1859–1865
Members of the Parliament of the United Kingdom for Newcastle-under-Lyme
Tory MPs (pre-1834)